Paaru Paaru Pattanam Paaru is a 1986 Indian Tamil-language comedy film directed by Manobala and written by P. Kalaimani. The film stars Mohan and Ranjini, in her first film as lead actress. It was released on 7 September 1986.

Plot 

A man believing immensely in astrology eventually has his life ruined.

Cast 
 Mohan
 Ranjini
 Vennira Aadai Moorthy
 Vinu Chakravarthy
 T. K. S. Chandran
 Ennathe Kannaiah
 Usilai Mani

Production 
After the success of Pillai Nila, director Manobala did not want to make another horror film, but preferred to make a comedy. Five of Ilaiyaraaja's unused songs were bought and P. Kalaimani weaved a story around them, which became Paaru Paaru Pattanam Paaru. It is the first film for Ranjini as lead actress.

Soundtrack 
The music was composed by Ilaiyaraaja.

Release and reception 
Paaru Paaru Pattanam Paaru was released on 7 September 1986. Jeyamanmadhan of Kalki wrote that almost three-quarters of the film would have been a full-length comedy if it had been extended and taken to happy end. According to Manobala, the film failed as audiences expected another suspenseful film like Pillai Nila from him.

References

External links 
 

1980s Tamil-language films
1986 comedy films
Films about astrology
Films about superstition
Films directed by Manobala
Films scored by Ilaiyaraaja
Indian comedy films